The name Narda has been used for five tropical cyclones in the Eastern Pacific Ocean.
 Tropical Storm Narda (1983)
 Tropical Storm Narda (1989)
 Hurricane Narda (2001)
 Tropical Storm Narda (2013)
 Tropical Storm Narda (2019), made landfall in southwestern Mexico. 

Pacific hurricane set index articles